is a Japanese freestyle skier. She competed in the 2018 Winter Olympics in the women's halfpipe. Her husband is multiple Olympic medalist Japanese Nordic combined athlete, Akito Watabe.

References

1989 births
Living people
Freestyle skiers at the 2018 Winter Olympics
Japanese female freestyle skiers
Olympic freestyle skiers of Japan